Pathophysiology is a quarterly peer-reviewed medical journal covering pathology and pathophysiology. It was established in 1994 and was originally published by Elsevier on behalf of the International Society for Pathophysiology. It was established by Toshikazu Yoshikawa, who was also its first editor-in-chief. The current editor-in-chief is J. Steven Alexander (Louisiana State University Health Sciences Center in Shreveport). The journal is abstracted and indexed in Chemical Abstracts, EMBASE, and Scopus. It is now published by MDPI since 2020.

References

External links

International Society for Pathophysiology

Pathophysiology
Pathology journals
Quarterly journals
Publications established in 1994
Physiology journals
English-language journals
MDPI academic journals